Helene Glykatzi-Ahrweiler FBA (born 29 August 1926) is a Greek-French academic Byzantinologist. She is also a UNICEF Goodwill Ambassador for Greece. In the 2008 show Great Greeks, she was named amongst the 100 greatest Greeks of all time.

Biography
She was born in Athens in 1926, to a family of refugees from Asia Minor. She graduated from high school in Athens, and studied "History and Archaeology" in the School of Philosophy in the University of Athens. After working in the Center for Asia Minor Studies, she moved to Paris in 1953 to continue her studies in the École pratique des hautes études where she obtained her doctorates in History and Classics. In 1955, she started working as a researcher in the French National Centre for Scientific Research (CNRS), and on 7 November 1958, she married the French Army officer Jacques Ahrweiler. In 1960, she completed her PhD in History from the University of Sorbonne. In 1964, she became the director of CNRS, and two years later, in 1966, she completed her second PhD in Philology. She has been a professor at the Sorbonne, Faculty of Arts in Paris, since 1967.

Helene Glykatzi-Ahrweiler by becoming Deputy Principal between 1970-1973 and Principal of the University of Paris 1 Panthéon-Sorbonne between 1976 and 1981, she did not only became the first woman to hold this post in the 700-year history of Sorbonne but, most importantly, became the first woman in the world to hold the post of a Principal in a world-renowned University. In 1982, French President François Mitterrand named her as Rector of the Academy of Paris and Chancellor of the Universities of Paris, a post she held until 1989. From February 1989 to August 1991, she was president of the Centre Georges Pompidou. She is also the Principal at the University of Europe in Paris, President of the Ethics Committee of the National Centre of Scientific Research in France, President of the European Cultural Centre of Delphi in Greece and Honorary President of the International Committee of Byzantine Studies. French president Jacques Chirac offered her the Medal of the Battalion Commander of the Legion of Honor (one of the highest awards of the French Republic), thus honoring her scientific work and directorship in various French universities as well as at the Cultural Centre Georges Pompidou in Paris. Throughout her academic career, she also became an Honorary Doctor of various universities in the world, including the ones of London, Belgrade, New York, Nouveau Brunswick, Lima, American University of Paris, Harvard and Haifa. She is also a member of various Academies in Europe as shown in the next section. In 2007, she received the title of Honorary Doctor of the Media Studies Department of the Aristotle University of Thessaloniki.

In 2008 she was named amongst the 100 greatest Greeks of all time.

Honours
She is a corresponding member of the British Academy, the Academy of Athens, the Berlin-Brandenburg Academy of Sciences and Humanities, the Bulgarian Academy of Sciences, and an associated member of the Royal Academy of Belgium. She holds a number of honorary doctorates, and has received numerous decorations from the French government:
 Commander of the Légion d'honneur
 Commander of the Ordre national du Mérite
 Commander of the Ordre des Palmes académiques
 Commander of the Ordre des Arts et des Lettres

Some of the titles she has received include: Brigadier of the Legion of Honor in Greece, Golden Cross of the Legion and Brigade of Honor, Golden Cross of the National Brigade of Values, Brigadier of Arts and Education, Golden Cross of the Brigade of the Academic Phoenix, Citizen Medal (France), Highest Brigadier (Mexico), Brigadier of the Brigade of Eagle (Iceland), Brigadier of the National Brigade (Luxemburg), Higher Brigadier of the Brigade of Values (Austria), Brigadier of the Royal Brigade Dannerog (Denmark), Brigadier of Science, Education and Art (Portugal), Brigadier of the Brigade of Values (Italy), honorary medal of the Polish Science Academy and Member of the Order of the International Olympic Committee.

Publications
 Byzance et la mer, 1966
 Études sur les structures administratives et sociales de Byzance, 1971
 L'Idéologie politique de l'empire byzantin, 1975
 Byzance : les pays et les territoires, 1976
 The Making of Europe, 1999
 Les Européens, 2000
 Le Roman d'Athènes, 2004

References

External Links

Sources
 Short Biography at Strabon.org
 

1926 births
Commandeurs of the Ordre des Palmes Académiques
Fellows of the British Academy
Greek Byzantinists
Greek emigrants to France
Living people
National and Kapodistrian University of Athens alumni
Writers from Athens
Recipients of the Olympic Order
UNICEF Goodwill Ambassadors
Academic staff of the University of Paris
Members of the German Academy of Sciences at Berlin
East German women
Corresponding Fellows of the British Academy
Scholars of Byzantine history
Women Byzantinists
Women medievalists
Corresponding Members of the Academy of Athens (modern)
Research directors of the French National Centre for Scientific Research